Vihtijärvi is a village in the northeast part of Vihti municipality, between the borders of Nurmijärvi, Hyvinkää, Loppi and Karkkila. The population is about 500. The regional road 132 (Mt 132) between Loppi and Klaukkala runs through the village. The nearest lakes are Niemenjärvi and Vihtijärvi, where the village got its name.

Vihtijärvi has its own school, a chapel, a cemetery and also a roadside restaurant, but there are no grocery stores in the village; the nearest store is located in the Röykkä village, about 5 km south from Vihtijärvi.

Hiiskula Manor is located on Vihtijärvi and was owned by Freirherr , baron and major general of the Russian Imperial Army, from 1845 to 1860.

See also
 Kytäjä
 Vihti (village)

References

Villages in Finland